This is a list of prequels.

Works with darker gray background shading have been primarily described as a sequel, remake, or reboot, but have also been regarded as prequels in a broad sense of the word.

Literature

Plays

Films

{| class="wikitable sortable" style="width:100%;"
|- 
! width="50%" |Prequel !! Original
|-
| The Golem: How He Came into the World (1920)||The Golem (1915)
|-
|Hey! Hey! USA (1938)||Good Morning, Boys (1937)
|-
|Oz the Great and Powerful (2013)||The Wizard of Oz (1939)
|-
|Another Part of the Forest (1948)||The Little Foxes (1941)
|-
|Bambi II (2006, video)||Bambi (1942)
|-
|The Seventh Victim (1943)||Cat People (1942)
|-
|The Brute Man (1946)||House of Horrors (1946)
|-
|Davy Crockett and the River Pirates (1956)||Davy Crockett, King of the Wild Frontier (1955)
|-
|Psycho IV: The Beginning (1990, TV)||Psycho (1960)
|-
|Zulu Dawn (1979)||Zulu (1964)
|-
|The Good, the Bad and the Ugly (1966)||A Fistful of Dollars (1964)For a Few Dollars More (1965)
|-
|Godzilla vs. Hedorah (1971)Godzilla vs. Gigan (1972)Godzilla vs. Megalon (1973)Godzilla vs. Mechagodzilla (1974)Terror of Mechagodzilla (1975)||Destroy All Monsters (1968)
|-
|style="background-color:gainsboro"|
Escape from the Planet of the Apes (1971)
Conquest of the Planet of the Apes (1972)
Battle for the Planet of the Apes (1973)
|Planet of the Apes (1968)Beneath the Planet of the Apes (1970)
|-
|Butch and Sundance: The Early Days (1979)||Butch Cassidy and the Sundance Kid (1969)
|-
|Easy Rider: The Ride Back (2012)||Easy Rider (1969)
|-
|The Rainbow (1989)||Women in Love (1969)
|-
|style="background-color:gainsboro"|The Godfather Part II (1974)||The Godfather (1972)
|-
|style="background-color:gainsboro"| Mortal Kombat: The Journey Begins (1995 animated film) || Mortal Kombat (1995)
|-
|style="background-color:gainsboro"|Exorcist: The Beginning (2004)Dominion: Prequel to the Exorcist (2005)||The Exorcist (1973)
|-
|Leatherface (2017)||The Texas Chain Saw Massacre (1974)
|-
|Fatal Flying Guillotine (1977)||Master of the Flying Guillotine (1976)
|-
|Star Wars: Episode I – The Phantom Menace (1999)Star Wars: Episode II – Attack of the Clones (2002)Star Wars: Episode III – Revenge of the Sith (2005)
Star Wars: The Clone Wars (2008)Rogue One: A Star Wars Story (2016)Solo: A Star Wars Story (2018)
|Star Wars (1977)
|-
| Prometheus (2012)Alien: Covenant (2017)|| Alien (1979)
|-
| Prey (2022) || Predator (1987)
|-
| Alien vs. Predator (2004)Aliens vs. Predator: Requiem (2007)||Alien (1979)The Predator (2018)
|-
|style="background-color:gainsboro"| Amityville II: The Possession (1982)The Amityville Murders (2018) || The Amityville Horror (1979)
|-
|style="background-color:gainsboro"| Diary of the Dead (2008)Survival of the Dead (2009) || Night of the Living Dead (1968)
|-
|Kermit's Swamp Years (2002, video)||The Muppet Movie (1979)
|-
|Indiana Jones and the Temple of Doom (1984)||Raiders of the Lost Ark (1981)
|-
|The Fox and the Hound 2 (2006, video)||The Fox and the Hound (1981)
|-
|The Thing (2011)||The Thing (1982)
|-
|Caravan of Courage: An Ewok Adventure (1984, TV)Ewoks: The Battle for Endor (1985, TV)||Return of the Jedi (1983)
|-
|Children of the Corn (2020) ||Children of the Corn (1984)
|-
|Missing in Action 2: The Beginning (1985)||Missing in Action (1984)
|-
|The First 9½ Weeks (1998, video)||9½ Weeks (1986)Another 9½ Weeks (1997, video)
|-
|Dirty Dancing: Havana Nights (2004)||Dirty Dancing (1987)
|-
|The Little Mermaid: Ariel's Beginning (2008, video)||The Little Mermaid (1989)
|-
|Puppet Master III: Toulon's Revenge (1991, video)||Puppet Master (1989, video)Puppet Master II (1991, video)
|-
|Tremors 4: The Legend Begins (2004, video)||Tremors (1990)
|-
|Twin Peaks: Fire Walk with Me (1992)||Twin Peaks (1990)
|-
|An American Tail: The Treasure of Manhattan Island (1998, video)An American Tail: The Mystery of the Night Monster (2000, video)||An American Tail: Fievel Goes West (1991)
|-
|Red Dragon (2002)Hannibal Rising (2007)||The Silence of the Lambs (1991)Hannibal (2001)
|-
|Carlito's Way: Rise to Power (2005, video)||Carlito's Way (1993)
|-
|Gods and Generals (2003)||Gettysburg (1993)
|-
|Dumb and Dumberer: When Harry Met Lloyd (2003)||Dumb and Dumber (1994)
|-
|The Flintstones in Viva Rock Vegas (2000)||The Flintstones (1994)
|-
|The Lion King 1½ (2004, video)||The Lion King (1994)
|-
|Casper: A Spirited Beginning (1997, TV)Casper Meets Wendy (1998, TV)||Casper (1995)
|-
|Lightyear (2022)||Toy Story (1995)
|-
|Cruella (2021)||101 Dalmatians (1996)
|-
|From Dusk Till Dawn 3: The Hangman's Daughter (2000, video)||From Dusk Till Dawn (1996)
|-
|Cube Zero (2004, video)||Cube (1997)
|-
|Joseph: King of Dreams (2000, video)||The Prince of Egypt (1998)
|-
|Ring 0: Birthday (2000)||Ring (1998)
|-
|style="background-color:gainsboro"| The Brave Little Toaster to the Rescue (1999, video)||The Brave Little Toaster Goes to Mars (1998, video)
|-
|Cruel Intentions 2 (2001, video)||Cruel Intentions (1999)
|-
|Old Men in New Cars (2002)
|In China They Eat Dogs (1999)
|-
|The Second Renaissance (2003 short animated film)||The Matrix (1999 live-action film)
|-
|Tarzan II (2005, video)||Tarzan (1999)
|-
|Final Destination 5 (2011)||Final Destination (2000)
|-
|Ginger Snaps Back: The Beginning (2004)||Ginger Snaps (2000)
|-
|X-Men Origins: Wolverine (2009)X-Men: First Class (2011)X-Men: Days of Future Past (2014)X-Men: Apocalypse (2016)Dark Phoenix (2019) ||X-Men (2000)
|-
|Fantastic Beasts and Where to Find Them (2016)Fantastic Beasts: The Crimes of Grindelwald (2018)Fantastic Beasts: The Secrets of Dumbledore (2022) ||Harry Potter and the Philosopher's Stone (2001)
|-
|The Scorpion King (2002)The Scorpion King 2: Rise of a Warrior (2008, video)The Scorpion King 3: Battle for Redemption (2012, video)The Scorpion King 4: Quest for Power (2015, video)The Scorpion King: Book of Souls (2018, video)||The Mummy Returns (2001)
|-
|La Tour 2 contrôle infernale (2016)||La Tour Montparnasse Infernale (2001)
|-
|Monsters University (2013)||Monsters, Inc. (2001)
|-
|The Hobbit: An Unexpected Journey (2012)The Hobbit: The Desolation of Smaug (2013)The Hobbit: The Battle of the Five Armies (2014)||The Lord of the Rings: The Fellowship of the Ring (2001)The Lord of the Rings: The Two Towers (2002)The Lord of the Rings: The Return of the King (2003)
|-
|Cabin Fever: Patient Zero (2014) || Cabin Fever (2002)Cabin Fever 2: Spring Fever (2009)
|-
|Infernal Affairs II (2003)||Infernal Affairs (2002)
|-
|National Lampoon's Van Wilder: Freshman Year (2009, video)||National Lampoon's Van Wilder (2002)
|-
|Scooby-Doo! The Mystery Begins (2009, TV)Scooby-Doo! Curse of the Lake Monster (2010, TV)Daphne & Velma (2018, video) || Scooby-Doo (2002) Scooby-Doo 2: Monsters Unleashed (2004)
|-
|Aileen Wuornos: American Boogeywoman (2021)
|Monster (2003)
|-
|The Texas Chainsaw Massacre: The Beginning (2006)||The Texas Chainsaw Massacre (2003)
|-
|Bionicle 2: Legends of Metru Nui (2004, video)Bionicle 3: Web of Shadows (2005, video)||Bionicle: Mask of Light (2003, video)
|-
|Lilo & Stitch 2: Stitch Has a Glitch (2005, video)||Stitch! The Movie (2003, video)
|-
|Underworld: Rise of the Lycans (2009)||Underworld (2003)Underworld: Evolution (2006)
|-
|Wrong Turn 4: Bloody Beginnings (2011, video)Wrong Turn 5: Bloodlines (2012, video) ||Wrong Turn (2003)Wrong Turn 2: Dead End (2007)Wrong Turn 3: Left for Dead (2009, video)
|-
| Leprechaun in the Hood (2000, video)Leprechaun: Back 2 tha Hood (2003, video) || Leprechaun 4: In Space (1997, video)
|-
| Hellraiser: Inferno (2000, video)Hellraiser: Hellseeker (2002, video)Hellraiser: Deader (2005, video)Hellraiser: Hellworld (2005, video) ||  Hellraiser: Bloodline (1996)
|-
|The Case of Hana & Alice (2015)||Hana and Alice (2004)
|-
|Puss in Boots (2011) ||Shrek 2 (2004)
|-
|Van Helsing: The London Assignment (2004 animated film)||Van Helsing (2004)
|-
|The Dukes of Hazzard: The Beginning (2007, TV)||The Dukes of Hazzard (2005)
|-
|Fast & Furious (2009)Fast Five (2011)Fast & Furious 6 (2013)||The Fast and the Furious: Tokyo Drift (2006)
|-
|Billa II (2012)||Billa (2007) 
|-
|Messengers 2: The Scarecrow (2009, video)||The Messengers (2007)
|-
|Paranormal Activity 2 (2010) ||Paranormal Activity (2007)
|-
|Smokin' Aces 2: Assassins' Ball (2010, video)||Smokin' Aces (2007)
|-
|Bumblebee (2018)Transformers: Rise of the Beasts (2023)||Transformers (2007)
|-
|Transmorphers: Fall of Man (2009, video)||Transmorphers (2007, video)
|-
|Vacancy 2: The First Cut (2009, video)||Vacancy (2007)
|-
|Marley & Me: The Puppy Years (2011, video)||Marley & Me (2008)
|-
|Death Race 2 (2010, video)Death Race 3: Inferno (2013, video)||Death Race (2008)
|-
|Open Season: Scared Silly (2016, video)||Open Season 3 (2011, video)
|-
|The Search for Santa Paws (2010)Santa Paws 2: The Santa Pups (2012)||Santa Buddies (2009)
|-
|Orphan: First Kill (2022)
|Orphan (2009)
|-
|Minions (2015)Minions: The Rise of Gru (2022)||Despicable Me (2010)
|-
|Insidious: Chapter 3 (2015)Insidious: The Last Key (2018)||Insidious (2010)Insidious: Chapter 2 (2013)
|-
|Red Dog: True Blue (2016)||Red Dog (2011)
|-
|Annabelle (2014)Annabelle: Creation (2017)The Nun (2018)Annabelle Comes Home (2019)||The Conjuring (2013)The Conjuring 2 (2016)
|-
|The First Purge" (2018) || " The Purge: Election Year " (2016)
|-
|Rise of the Footsoldier: The Pat Tate Story (2017)Rise of the Footsoldier: Marbella(2019)Rise of the Footsoldier: Origins (2021)||Rise of the Footsoldier (2007)
|-
|Wonder Woman (2017)Wonder Woman 1984 (2020) ||Man of Steel (2013)Batman v Superman: Dawn of Justice (2016)Justice League (2017)
|-
|Zack Snyder's Justice League (2021)||Aquaman (2018)
|-
|Kong: Skull Island (2017)||Godzilla (2014)Godzilla: King of the Monsters (2019)Godzilla vs. Kong (2021)
|-
|Wonder Woman: Bloodlines (2019, video)||Justice League: War (2014, video)
|-
|Ouija: Origin of Evil (2016)||Ouija (2014)
|-
|The King's Man (2021)||Kingsman: The Secret Service (2014)Kingsman: The Golden Circle (2017)
|-
|The Hunger Games: The Ballad of Songbirds and Snakes (2023)
|The Hunger Games (2012)The Hunger Games: Catching Fire (2013)The Hunger Games: Mockingjay – Part 1 (2014)The Hunger Games: Mockingjay – Part 2 (2015)
|-
|}

Channel and television series

Feature films

Comics

Consoles, computer and video games

Manga and anime
{| class="wikitable sortable" style="width:100%;"
|- 
! width="50%" |Prequel !! Original
|-
| Fist of the Blue Sky (2001–current)
| Fist of the North Star (1983–1988)
|-
| Dragon Ball Z: Bardock – The Father of Goku (1990)Jaco the Galactic Patrolman (2013)
| Dragon Ball (1984–1995 manga series)Dragon Ball (1986–1989 anime)
|-
| Dragon Ball Super (2015–2018)Dragon Ball Super: Broly (2018)
| Dragon Ball GT (1996–1997)
|-
| Go Nagai's Demon Knight (2007)
| Devilman (1972)
|-
| Rozen Maiden: Ouvertüre (2006)
| Rozen Maiden (2004)Rozen Maiden: Träumend (2005–2006)
|-
| Hellsing: The Dawn (2001–current)
| Hellsing (1997–current)
|-
| Saint Seiya Episode.G (2002–current)
| Saint Seiya (1986–1991)
|-
| Saint Seiya: Next Dimension (2006–current)Saint Seiya: The Lost Canvas (2006–2011)
| Saint Seiya Episode.G (2002–current)Saint Seiya (1986–1991)
|-
| Ga-Rei Zero  (2008 anime series)
| Ga-Rei  (2005–2010 manga series)
|-
| Lupin III: The Woman Called Fujiko Mine (2012 anime series)
| Lupin III (1967 manga series)
|-
| 2112: The Birth of Doraemon (1995)
| Doraemon (1969–1996 manga series) 
|-
| Perman: The Birdman has Arrived! (1983)
| Perman (1967 manga series)
|-
| Pokémon Journeys episode 1: Enter Pikachu! (2019)
| Pokémon (1997–current)
|-
| Fairy Tail Zero (2016)
| Fairy Tail (2006–2017)
|-
| Ginga Densetsu Riki (2002 manga series)
| Ginga Nagareboshi Gin (1983–1987)
|-
| One Piece: Strong World Episode 0 (2009 anime)
| One Piece (1997–current)
|-
| Tenchi Muyo! In Love (1996)
| Tenchi Universe (1995)
|-
| Tenchi Muyo! Ryo Ohki OVA 3 (2003)
| Tenchi Muyo! GXP (2002)
|-
| Hakaba Kitaro (2008)
| GeGeGe no Kitaro'' (1968-1969)

Cross-media

References

Entertainment lists
 Lists